The 2023 F4 Spanish Championship will be the eighth season of the Spanish F4 Championship. It will be a multi-event motor racing championship for open wheel, formula racing cars regulated according to FIA Formula 4 regulations, based in Spain. It will be the second full season in which the series is partnered with the Richard Mille Young Talent Academy.

Entry list

Race calendar and results
The calendar was announced on 23 November 2022. The five rounds in Spain will be organized by the RFEDA. The season opener at Circuit de Spa-Francorchamps will be held in support of the 24H GT Series and the second abroad event will take place at Circuito do Estoril.

Notes

References

External links 

 

Spanish
Spanish F4 Championship seasons
F4
Spanish F4
Spanish F4